Major-General Alfred Eryk Robinson  (19 September 1894 – 1978) was a British Army officer.

Military career
Robinson was born in Scarborough, North Yorkshire, in 1894, and was educated at Scarborough College. He later entered the Royal Military College, Sandhurst, from where he was commissioned into the Green Howards on 12 August 1914 and saw service during the First World War. He was wounded twice during the war and was also mentioned in dispatches twice.

He remained in the army during the interwar period and the start of  World War II saw him as commanding officer of the 1st Battalion the Green Howards in 1939 and commanded the battalion during the Norwegian campaign, before being given command of 115th Brigade in October 1940 on his return to England. He went on to be General Officer Commanding 47th (London) Infantry Division in September 1942, Director-General of Air Defence at the Air Ministry in 1944 and Inspector of Ground Combat Training at the Air Ministry in 1945 before retiring in 1948.

He was colonel of the Green Howards from 1949 to 1959.

He was a Deputy Lieutenant for North Riding of Yorkshire from 1952 and a Justice of the peace from 1953.

References

Bibliography

External links
Generals of World War II

|-

|-

1894 births
1978 deaths
Companions of the Order of the Bath
Companions of the Distinguished Service Order
Green Howards officers
British Army generals of World War II
British Army personnel of World War I
Graduates of the Royal Military College, Sandhurst
British military personnel of the 1936–1939 Arab revolt in Palestine
People from Scarborough, North Yorkshire
People educated at Scarborough College
Deputy Lieutenants of North Yorkshire
English justices of the peace
British Army major generals
Military personnel from Yorkshire